This list of Dallas Sidekicks seasons includes all of the seasons played by the original Dallas Sidekicks based at Reunion Arena in Dallas, Texas.

Year-by-year 1984–2004 

 *There were 7 seasons where the league the Sidekicks were competing in did not feature divisions, so there was a regular season number one seed, or league champion, before the playoffs began.
 **This 1986-87 Sidekicks team was inducted into the Pizza Hut Park Texans Credit Union Walk of Fame. Known forever in Dallas as the "Never Say Die" season, the Dallas Sidekicks defeated a heavily favored Tacoma Stars squad to win the 1987 MISL Championship. Down three games to two in a best-of-seven series, the Sidekicks won the final two games 5-4 and 4-3 respectively, both in overtime and both in front of sold-out arenas in Tacoma and Dallas.

 
Dallas Sidekicks (1984–2004) seasons
Dallas Sidekicks